Yuka Kagami (born 14 September 2001) is a Japanese freestyle wrestler. She won one of the bronze medals in the women's 76kg event at the 2022 World Wrestling Championships held in Belgrade, Serbia. She is a two-time medalist, including gold, at the Asian Wrestling Championships.

Career 

She won the bronze medal in the girls' freestyle 73 kg event at the 2018 Summer Youth Olympics held in Buenos Aires, Argentina.

In 2019, at the Golden Grand Prix Ivan Yarygin held in Krasnoyarsk, Russia, she won the silver medal in the women's 72 kg event. In that same year, she also won the gold medal in the women's 72 kg event at the 2019 Asian Wrestling Championships held in Xi'an, China. At the 2019 World U23 Wrestling Championship held in Budapest, Hungary she won the silver medal in the 76 kg event.

She won the silver medal in her event at the 2022 Asian Wrestling Championships held in Ulaanbaatar, Mongolia. She won one of the bronze medals in the women's 76kg event at the 2022 World Wrestling Championships held in Belgrade, Serbia.

Achievements

References

External links 

 

Living people
Place of birth missing (living people)
Japanese female sport wrestlers
Wrestlers at the 2018 Summer Youth Olympics
Medalists at the 2018 Summer Youth Olympics
Asian Wrestling Championships medalists
World Wrestling Championships medalists
21st-century Japanese women
2001 births